Barbora Krejčíková and Kateřina Siniaková were the defending champions, having won the event in 2013, but neither player decided to participate this year.

Ioana Ducu and Ioana Loredana Roșca won the title, defeating CiCi Bellis and Markéta Vondroušová in the final, 6–1, 5–7, [11–9].

Seeds

Draw

Finals

Top half

Bottom half

External links 
 Draw

Girls' Doubles
French Open, 2014 Girls' Doubles